Pechbonnieu (Languedocien: Puègbonieu) is a commune in the Haute-Garonne department in southwestern France.

Population
The inhabitants of the commune are known as Pechbonniliens and Pechbonniliennes in French.

Monuments

See also
Communes of the Haute-Garonne department

References

Communes of Haute-Garonne